Hans van Abeelen (20 November 1936 – 21 August 1998) was the first Dutch behaviour geneticist. He obtained his M.Sc from the University of Groningen and his Ph.D. from the Catholic University of Nijmegen in 1965, where he stayed for the rest of his career as "wetenschappelijk hoofdmedewerker". He was a founding member of the Behavior Genetics Association and was a member-at-large of its executive committee from 1984 till 1987. He also served on the editorial board of its journal, Behavior Genetics, from its creation in 1971 to 1992. Van Abeelen took early retirement in 1991, but nevertheless became one of the founding members of the International Behavioural and Neural Genetics Society. Over the span of his career, he published 64 articles and book chapters and edited a book, The Genetics of Behaviour, which was an early overview of European behaviour genetics.

Notable publications

References 

Behavior geneticists
1936 births
1998 deaths
People from Enschede
Dutch neuroscientists
Dutch geneticists
University of Groningen alumni
Academic staff of Radboud University Nijmegen
20th-century Dutch zoologists